Karl Sigwald Johannes Bull (30 June 1860 – 27 December 1936) was a Norwegian military officer and politician for the Conservative Party. He is best known as the Norwegian Minister of Defence from 1910 to 1912.

Personal life
He was born in Kristiania as the son of military officer and politician Anders Sandøe Ørsted Bull and his wife Caroline Elisabeth Dahl. Also, he was a grandson of Supreme Court Justice Georg Jacob Bull, a great-grandson of Chief Justice Johan Randulf Bull, a great-grandnephew of Johan Lausen Bull and a first cousin of chief physician Edvard Isak Hambro Bull. His son Georg Jacob Falck Bull (1892–1977) became a major general.

Career
He graduated from officer's school in 1880, held the rank of second lieutenant from 1880 and premier lieutenant from 1883. In 1889 he was promoted to captain. He worked for the Norwegian Mapping and Cadastre Authority (then known as Den geografiske opmaaling) from 1889 to 1891, and as a teacher at the Norwegian Military College from 1891 to 1907. He was known as a writer of military literature. From 1905 Bull held the rank of lieutenant colonel in the army, and at the Negotiations in Karlstad in the same year, he was present as a Norwegian military representative.

On 2 February 1910, when the cabinet Konow assumed office, Bull was appointed as the new Minister of Defence. He held this position until 19 February 1912, when the cabinet resigned. He returned to his military career. In 1911 he had been promoted to colonel and chief of the Fourth Infantry Regiment of East Akershus. He died in December 1936.

References

1860 births
1936 deaths
Norwegian Army personnel
Conservative Party (Norway) politicians
Military personnel from Oslo
Defence ministers of Norway
Politicians from Oslo